The St. Petersburg Open is a professional men's tennis tournament played on indoor hard courts. It is part of the ATP Tour 250 series of the Association of Tennis Professionals (ATP) Tour. The tournament was held annually at the Petersburg Sports and Concert Complex in St. Petersburg, Russia, since 1995. The tournament takes place in mid to late September, following the conclusion of the US Open. The singles competition features 28 male competitors, while the doubles one features 16 duo teams. The competition has a total prize money pool of $1,180,000 USD. 

2002 Australian Open champion Thomas Johansson and former World No. 1s Marat Safin and Andy Murray are the only players to have won the singles titles more than once. Five Russian players have won the singles title: Yevgeny Kafelnikov in 1995, Marat Safin in 2000 and 2001, Mikhail Youzhny in 2004, Daniil Medvedev in 2019, and Andrey Rublev in 2020. The event was not held in 2014 but resumed in 2015, at the Sibur Arena. The event was exceptionally held as an ATP 500 tournament in the 2020 edition.

In reaction to the 2022 Russian invasion of Ukraine, the ATP moved the 2022 St. Petersburg Open from Saint Petersburg to Kazakhstan.

Past finals

Singles

Doubles

Prize pool

The prize pool for this tournament consists of $1,000,000 USD. It is an ATP 500 level tournament, thus the men's singles champion receives 500 ATP ranking points.

References

External links
 
 ATP tournament profile

 
Hard court tennis tournaments
Indoor tennis tournaments
Tennis tournaments in Russia
Sports competitions in Saint Petersburg
Recurring sporting events established in 1995
ATP Tour 250
1995 establishments in Russia